Labeo reidi is a species of fish in the genus Labeo.

It is known only from the Upper Congo River (Kisangani and Yangambi) in Africa.

References 

Labeo
Taxa named by Sinaseli-Marcel Tshibwabwa
Fish described in 1997
Endemic fauna of the Democratic Republic of the Congo